The Northern Iowa Panthers women's basketball team represents the University of Northern Iowa, located in Cedar Falls, Iowa, in NCAA Division I basketball competition. UNI is currently a member of the Missouri Valley Conference.

History 

On March 4, 2017, Tanya Warren became the all-time wins leader in Northern Iowa women's basketball history. She reached her 184th career win with a victory over Missouri State.

Rivalries 

The school has several statewide and national rivalries. In Iowa, typically UNI plays two, if not three of its Iowa neighbors each season. The university plays the University of Iowa, Iowa State University, and Drake University. Additionally, other UNI basketball rivals include, but are not limited to, Creighton University, Indiana State, Southern Illinois, and Wichita State.

NCAA tournament results

References

External links
 

 
1968 establishments in Iowa
Basketball teams established in 1968